The giant pouched rats (genus Cricetomys) of sub-Saharan Africa are large muroid rodents.

Description

Taxonomy
Giant pouched rats are only distantly related to the true rats, although until recently they had been placed in the same family, Muridae. Recent molecular studies, however, place them in the family Nesomyidae, part of an ancient radiation of African and Malagasy muroids. The name "pouched rat" refers to their large cheek pouches.

The species are:

Behaviour
Females have been said to be capable of producing up to 10 litters yearly. Gestation is 27–36 days. The animals generally have between  six and eight nipples. One to five young are born at a time. 

The animals are nocturnal omnivores, and feed on vegetation and small animals, especially insects. They have a particular taste for palm nuts.

Interaction with humans
In many African countries, giant pouched rats are valued as an important food item.

They are easily tamed as pets, but were associated with an outbreak of monkeypox in the USA in 2003, and have since been banned from importation to the U.S.

Detecting explosives and tuberculosis by scent
These rats are also becoming useful in some areas for detecting land mines; their acute sense of smell is very effective in detecting explosives such as TNT, and at the same time they are light enough to not detonate any of the mines. The rats are being trained by APOPO, a nonprofit social venture based in Tanzania.

The procedure for training rats to detect land mines was conceived of and developed by Belgian Bart Weetjens. Training starts at four weeks of age, when the rats are handled to accustom them to humans and exposed to a variety of sights and sounds. They learn to associate a clicker with a food reward of banana or banana-peanut paste. They are then trained to indicate a hole that contains TNT by nosing it for five seconds. Then they learn to find the correct hole in a line of holes. Finally, the rat is trained to wear a harness and practises outdoors on a lead, finding inactive mines under soil. At the end of their training, they are tested; they must find all the mines in an area of  that has been seeded with inactivated mines. It is a blind test; their handlers do not know where the mines are. If they succeed, they are certified as bomb-sniffing rats.

APOPO is also training the rats to detect tuberculosis by sniffing sputum samples. The rats can test many more samples than a scientist can—hundreds in a day, compared with 30 to 40 by traditional methods. Land mine and tuberculosis sniffing rats are called HeroRATs.

In popular culture
Ben, in the 2003 remake of Willard, was a Gambian pouched rat.

References

Further reading
 Nowak, R. M. 1999. Walker's Mammals of the World, Vol. 2. Johns Hopkins University Press, London

External links
APOPO's HeroRATs
UKpouchies, free information site
National Pouched Rat Society, NPRS Pouched Rat Society

Rodents of Africa
Cricetomys
Taxa named by George Robert Waterhouse